Apple is the only full-length studio album by the American rock band Mother Love Bone. It was released on July 19, 1990, through Stardog/Mercury Records.

Days before Apple was slated to be released, lead singer Andrew Wood overdosed on heroin. After spending a few days in the hospital in a coma, he died, effectively bringing Mother Love Bone to an end. The album would see release later that year in July, and it eventually peaked at number 34 on Billboard's Top Heatseekers chart in 1992. Kim Neely of Rolling Stone said that the album "succeeds where countless other hard-rock albums have failed, capturing the essence of what made Zep – dynamics, kids! – and giving it a unique Nineties spin."

Reception
In 2005, Apple was ranked No. 462 in Rock Hard magazine's book of "The 500 Greatest Rock & Metal Albums of All Time". In 2016, Apple was ranked No. 18 in Rolling Stone magazine's "40 Greatest One-Album Wonders".

Track listing
All lyrics written by Andrew Wood. All music written by Jeff Ament, Bruce Fairweather, Greg Gilmore, Stone Gossard, and Andrew Wood. Primary composers listed below.

"This Is Shangrila" (Gossard) – 3:42
"Stardog Champion" (Gossard) – 4:58
"Holy Roller" (Ament) – 4:27
"Bone China" (Gossard) – 3:44
"Come Bite the Apple" (Gossard) – 5:26
"Stargazer" (Wood) – 4:49
"Heartshine" – 4:36
"Captain Hi-Top" – 3:07
"Man of Golden Words" (Wood) – 3:41
"Capricorn Sister" (Gossard) – 4:19
"Gentle Groove" (Wood) – 4:02
"Mr. Danny Boy" (Gossard) – 4:50
"Crown of Thorns" (Wood) – 6:18

Reissue bonus track
"Lady Godiva Blues" – 3:40

Personnel

Mother Love Bone
Andrew Wood – lead vocals, piano
Bruce Fairweather – lead guitar
Stone Gossard – rhythm guitar
Jeff Ament – bass
Greg Gilmore – drums

Production
Scott Blockland – assistant engineering
Bruce Calder – production on "Stargazer"
Terry Date, Mother Love Bone – production
Mark Dearnley – production on "Crown of Thorns"
Kaylin Frank – production coordination
Dennis Herring, Davitt Sigerson – pre-production
Klotz – design
Bob Ludwig – mastering
Lance Mercer – photo
Tim Palmer – mixing
 Denny Swofford – assistance

References

1990 debut albums
Mother Love Bone albums
Albums produced by Terry Date
Albums produced by Stone Gossard
Albums produced by Jeff Ament
Mercury Records albums
Albums published posthumously